Abapeba abalosi is a species of spider belonging to the family Corinnidae.

It is native to Paraguay and Argentina.

References

Corinnidae
Spiders described in 1942
Spiders of Argentina
Spiders of South America